High Power Electric Propulsion (HiPEP) is a variation of ion thruster for use in nuclear electric propulsion applications. It was ground-tested in 2003 by NASA and was intended for use on the Jupiter Icy Moons Orbiter, which was canceled in 2005.

Theory 
The HiPEP thruster differs from earlier ion thrusters because the xenon ions are produced using a combination of microwave and magnetic fields. The ionization is achieved through a process called Electron Cyclotron Resonance (ECR). In ECR, the small number of free electrons present in the neutral gas gyrate around the static magnetic field lines. The injected microwaves' frequency is set to match this gyrofrequency and a resonance is established. Energy is transferred from the right-hand polarized portion of the microwave to the electrons. This energy is then transferred to the bulk gas/plasma via the rare - yet important - collisions between electrons and neutrals. During these collisions, electrons can be knocked free from the neutrals, forming ion-electron pairs. The process is a highly efficient means of creating a plasma in low density gases. Previously the electrons required were provided by a hollow cathode.

Specifications 
The thruster itself is in the 20-50 kW class, with a specific impulse of 6,000-9,000 seconds, and a propellant throughput capability exceeding 100 kg/kW. The goal of the project, as of June 2003, was to achieve a technology readiness level of 4-5 within 2 years.

The pre-prototype HiPEP produced 670 mN of thrust at a power level of 39.3 kW using 7.0 mg/s of fuel giving a specific impulse of 9620 s.  Downrated to 24.4 kW, the HiPEP used 5.6 mg/s of fuel giving a specific impulse of 8270 s and 460 mN of thrust.

Project and development history 

Phase 1 was early 2003.

Current status

See also
List of spacecraft with electric propulsion
Solar electric propulsion
Exploration of Jupiter

References

External links 
 NASA GRC Media Packet on HiPEP.

Ion engines